Anatoma tenuis is a species of minute sea snail, a marine gastropod mollusk or micromollusk in the family Anatomidae.

Distribution
This marine species occurs off the Azores and the Virgin Islands.

References

 Gofas, S.; Le Renard, J.; Bouchet, P. (2001). Mollusca, in: Costello, M.J. et al. (Ed.) (2001). European register of marine species: a check-list of the marine species in Europe and a bibliography of guides to their identification. Collection Patrimoines Naturels, 50: pp. 180–213

External links
 To Encyclopedia of Life
 To USNM Invertebrate Zoology Mollusca Collection
 To World Register of Marine Species

Anatomidae
Gastropods described in 1877